John Rafferty (July 3, 1953 – June 30, 2019) was a Canadian politician, who served as the Member of Parliament for Thunder Bay—Rainy River from 2008 to 2015 for the NDP.

Rafferty was previously the party's candidate in Thunder Bay—Superior North for the 2000 federal election, in Thunder Bay—Rainy River for the 2004 and 2006 federal elections, and in Thunder Bay—Atikokan in the 2003 and 2007 provincial elections. Provincially, he lost to incumbent MPP Bill Mauro by a margin of just 50 votes in 2007.

Rafferty was born in Wingham, Ontario. He worked as a radio broadcaster for CKPR in Thunder Bay before leaving to pursue his first election campaign. He subsequently launched his own business producing voiceovers for educational and training videos.

Rafferty introduced one piece of legislation: the National Strategy for Fetal Alcohol Spectrum Disorder Act. He first introduced it on September 30, 2010, in the third session of the 40th Parliament as a private member's bill. He re-introduced it in June 2011, during the first session of the 41st Parliament.

He was slated to represent the Ontario New Democratic Party in the 2018 Ontario provincial election campaign, but withdrew in January 2018 due to ill health. He died on June 30, 2019 from cancer, at the age of 65, three days before his 66th birthday.

Electoral record

References

External links
John Rafferty

Members of the House of Commons of Canada from Ontario
New Democratic Party MPs
Politicians from Thunder Bay
2019 deaths
Canadian radio personalities
1953 births
21st-century Canadian politicians
Deaths from cancer in Ontario
People from Wingham, Ontario